The Water Sprite is the debut album by the Empyrium reunion band Noekk. Along with a standard single-CD version, the album was also released in a digipak 2-CD version.

Track listing

 "The Watersprite" - 6:33
 "T.B.'s Notion" - 5:05
 "Strange Mountain" - 7:01
 "How Fortunate the Man with None" - 7:51
 "The Fiery Flower" - 5:01
 "Moonface is Dead" - 4:28
 "The Riddle Seeker" - 10:24

"T.B.'s Notion" has lyrics by J.R.R. Tolkien.
"How Fortunate the Man with None" is a cover of a song by Dead Can Dance.

2005 debut albums
Noekk albums